Poet in New York (in Spanish, Poeta en Nueva York) is one of the most important works of Spanish author Federico García Lorca. It is a body of poems composed during the visit of the poet to Columbia University in New York in the years 1929/1930. During his stay, the stock market crashed in October 1929, an event which profoundly affected his poetic vision.

After his stay in New York, Lorca traveled to Cuba, where he wrote one of the poems included in the book, "Son de negros en Cuba", before returning to Spain. The book was not published until 1940, after Lorca's death. Due to Franco's dictatorship, it was originally released in Mexico and the United States (translated by Rolfe Humphries).

In 1929, García Lorca had left Spain to attend some conferences in the United States and Cuba. Yet, it is said Lorca's reason to leave their homeland was to make a change of environment due to self-identity reasons with his sexuality and the oppression the author was suffering from.

See also
The Public (play)

References

1940 poetry books
Poetry by Federico García Lorca
Spanish poetry collections